Celia Montalván was a Mexican film, stage and television actress, who had a big impact on the development of Mexican cinema and photography.

Biography 
Celia Montalván was born in August 1899 in Mexico City, Mexico.

Her first theater debut was along Aurora Walker in the "Las Walkirias" play. Her next big success was in the  Spanish play "Las Corsarias".

In 1920, she made her debut as a leading actress. She gained a very large popularity - people started printing post cards with her image. The postcards with Celia Montalván's image resulted in breaking the records for sales at the time, especially after her great success in the Revista Theater.

The next big step in Montalván's career was her appearances in magazines like "¡Ra-Ta-Plan!".

After having success with theater and magazines, her focus turned toward movies and she had a big success with El milagro de la Guadalupana in 1925. She became the first Mexican woman to film in Europe.

In 1929, she started filming in Hollywood with the Rodriguez brothers. In 1935 she filmed her most famous piece of cinema, which was directed by Jean Renoir.

Filmography 

 El milagro de la Guadalupana (1925)
 Don Juan diplomático (1931)
 El proceso de Mary Dugan (1931)
 Sangre mexicana (1931)
 Toni (1935)
 Club Verde (1945)

References 

1899 births
1958 deaths
Mexican actresses
Mexican expatriates in the United States